The World Dance Council Ltd (WDC), is a registered limited company, the legal successor to the International Council of Ballroom Dancing, and was established at a meeting organized by Phillip J. S. Richardson on 22 September 1950 in Edinburgh, Scotland. From 1996 to 2006 the WDC was known as the World Dance & Dance Sport Council Ltd (WD&DSC). The stated mission of the World Dance Council is to inspire, stimulate and promote excellence in education for the World Dance Council and Amateur League (WDC and AL) community.

The primary objective, at the time of its formation, was to provide an agreed basis for holding world championships in competitive ballroom dance. That objective has been achieved. Initially consisting of nine European countries and three others, today the WDC has become the leading authority on professional dance competitions, with members in numerous countries throughout the world. Each country is allowed one vote. As of 2006, there are 59 members. Its governing body, the Presidium, consists of a President and a number of Vice-Presidents. In 2014 seven Vice Presidents were elected.

WDC includes the Competitive Dance Committee, the Dancesation Committee and the a private public partnership agreement with the WDC Amateur League (WDCAL)

Mode of Operation 
The WDC is democratic in its operation. All major decisions are taken on the basis of one full member, one vote. The full members are (with a few exceptions) individual countries. There are some Affiliate members, such as the Ballroom Dancers Federation International. The WDC operates through a general council and two committees:

 The World Competitive Dance Committee regulates professional competitive dancing and all matters to do with competitions and their regulations.
 The Dancesation Committee deals with all matters of the dance profession that relate to the activities of Dance Schools and Dance Teachers and all other forms of dance like performing arts, hip Hop, Argentine Tango to name but a few. It does not regulate social dance directly. That is the business of individual organisers.
 The WDC Amateur League was founded in 2007. It regulates and designates the World and continental Amateur championships and licenses and regulates Amateur Dancing.

Each member country in the WDC has its own national organisation, such as the British Dance Council, which acts as a forum for the interested parties in that country. The national bodies decide on their delegates to the WDC. The WDC also operates a WDC National Dance Council system in certain countries, which allows a multi-member system within that NDC, fostering the co-operation of major dance organisations in these countries.

WDC Events 
These events are under WDC regulation, but organised in various countries each year.

World Championship – Professional Ballroom
World Championship – Professional Latin
World Championship – Professional 10-Dance
European Championship – Professional 10-Dance
European Championship – Professional Latin

There are also other events, which are licensed to organising countries, and are open entry.
WDC Amateur League Open Amateur World Championships & Disney Professional Cups.
Kremlin World Cup Latin
World Masters Latin
WDC World Cup. In 2009, this event in Shenzhen, China had over 2000 participants.
In the regulations, the facility is also available for professional competitions in:
Ballroom Show Dance
Latin American Show Dance

WDC competition rules 
 The WDC Championships are open championships.
 The national bodies nominate their best available couples, and only two couples are permitted from any one country. Additionally 3 Wild Cards from the World Series Ranking List are invited. WDC registered competitors can take part as open entries.

Presidents 
 P. J. S. Richardson MBE (ICBD) 
 Alex Moore MBE (ICBD)
 Bill Irvine MBE (ICBD)
 Leonard Morgan (ICBD)
 Robin Short (WD&DSC)
 Karl Breuer (WD&DSC)
Donnie Burns MBE

World Championship Winners 
 World Ballroom Dance Champions
 World Latin Dance Champions
 World 10 Dance Champions
 World Ballroom Dance Champions Amateur

See also 
 World DanceSport Federation
 Ballroom dance
 Competitive dance
 Ballroom Dancers' Federation
 Dancesport

References 

 World Dance Council History
 World Dance Council Education Department

External links 
 World Dance Council

International organisations based in the United Kingdom
Dance organizations
Dancesport
Ballroom dance
1950 establishments in the United Kingdom
Companies based in Edinburgh